Aqhu Phichaqa (Aymara aqhu tooth, phichaqa big needle,  Hispanicized spelling Ajopichaca) is a mountain in the Andes of Peru, about  high. It is located in the Cusco Region, Espinar Province, on the border of the districts of Condoroma and Ocoruro. Aqhu Phichaqa lies between Yana Urqu in the northeast and Janq'u Q'awa in the southwest.

References

Mountains of Peru
Mountains of Cusco Region